Eudonia cyptastis is a moth in the family Crambidae. It was described by Edward Meyrick in 1909. This species is endemic to New Zealand.

The wingspan is 17–20 mm. The forewings are fuscous, variably mixed or suffused with whitish. The hindwings are pale whitish-fuscous, with a faint yellowish tinge. The termen is suffused with fuscous. Adults have been recorded on wing in November.

References

Moths described in 1909
Eudonia
Endemic fauna of New Zealand
Moths of New Zealand
Taxa named by Edward Meyrick
Endemic moths of New Zealand